Ardal (also Romanized as Ardāl) is a village in Sohr va Firuzan Rural District, Pir Bakran District, Falavarjan County, Isfahan Province, Iran. At the 2006 census, its population was 609, in 156 families.

References 

Populated places in Falavarjan County